Aquila Suite - 12 Arpeggio Concert Études for Solo Piano was a music project by Uli Jon Roth composed for solo piano. It was written in the summer of 1991, and recorded at Sky Studio Seaford in 1991,  but unreleased until 1998. All piano music performed and sequenced on Kurzweil piano. Written and produced by  U.J. Roth. Aquila Suite is dedicated to the Spirit of Franz Liszt.

Track listing
 Aquila Suite - The Eagle and the Rainbow 2:02
 Zephyrus - The Southwind - Je Réviens 2:25  
 Endymion - The Eternal Sleeper - Balahé 2:25  
 Ballerina - Dance With Infinity 2:53  
 Aprilis - Melting Snow of the North 1:45  
 Cygnus - The Swan of the West 3:58  
 Aeolos - Father of Winds - Autumn Leaves 0:50  
 Flora - Bride of the Summer Wind 2:17  
 Boreas - Northeast River Wind 1:54  
 Lethe - River of Oblivion - Arpège 4:17  
 Galatea - Daughter of Oceans 1:46  
 Aqua vitae - Poseidon's Water of Life - Eau Sauvage 2:18

Total length: 26:10

Uli Jon Roth albums
1998 classical albums
Suites (music)
Compositions for solo piano
Contemporary classical compositions